"My Girl Has Gone" is a 1965 R&B single recorded by The Miracles for Motown's Tamla label. Included on their 1965 album Going to a Go-Go, "My Girl Has Gone" was the follow-up to the group's number 16 Billboard Hot 100 million-selling hit "The Tracks Of My Tears".

Written by Miracles members Smokey Robinson, Ronnie White, Pete Moore, and Marv Tarplin, the single was a Top 20 Pop hit, peaking at number 14 on the Billboard Hot 100 in the United States, and was also a Top 5 R&B hit, peaking at number three on Billboard's R&B singles chart. According to Robinson, Moore, and Bobby Rogers, the inspiration behind "My Girl Has Gone" was the guitar riffs of Miracles member Marv Tarplin, who also inspired "The Tracks of My Tears". Marv employed a 12 string guitar on the song, accompanied by the other Miracles' gospel-inspired harmonies, arranged by Miracle Pete Moore (who was, for years, the group's uncredited vocal arranger). As with many Miracles songs, the lyrics of "My Girl has Gone" describe the end of the narrator's relationship with his lover:
My girl has gone, and said goodbye
Don't you cry, hold your head up high
Don't give up, give love one more try,
 'Cause there's a right girl for every guy.

Cash Box described it as a "plaintive, slow moving rhythmic lament which sez that broken romances aren’t so serious ’cause there’s plenty of fish in the sea." 

"My Girl Has Gone" has been covered by artists such as Etienne Daho, Edwyn Collins, Ken Parker, and Motown labelmate Bobby Taylor. The Miracles can be seen performing "My Girl Has Gone" on the Motown DVD release, Smokey Robinson & The Miracles :The Definitive Performances 1963-1987.

Personnel Credits

Personnel-The Miracles
Smokey Robinson-lead vocals, co-writer, producer
Claudette Rogers Robinson-background vocals
Pete Moore-background vocals, co-writer, vocal arrangements
Ronnie White-background vocals, co-writer
Bobby Rogers-background vocals
Marv Tarplin-guitar, co-writer

Other Personnel
Other instrumentation by The Funk Brothers

Footnotes

The Miracles songs
Motown singles
1965 songs
1965 singles
Songs written by Marv Tarplin
Songs about loneliness
Songs written by Smokey Robinson
Songs written by Warren "Pete" Moore
Songs written by Ronald White